This is a list of the Malayan state and settlement electoral districts used between 1954 and 1959. This arrangement was used in the 1954 and 1955 Malayan state election.

Perlis

Kedah

Kelantan

Trengganu

Penang Settlement

Perak

Pahang

Selangor

Negri Sembilan

Malacca

Johore

References

Elections in Malaysia
Lists of constituencies